Jaryd Emanuel Jones-Smith (born September 3, 1995) is an American football offensive tackle for the St. Louis BattleHawks of the XFL. He was signed by the Houston Texans as an undrafted free agent in 2018 following his college football career with the Pittsburgh Panthers.

Professional career

Houston Texans
Jones-Smith signed with the Houston Texans as an undrafted free agent following the 2018 NFL Draft on May 11, 2020. He was waived during final roster cuts on September 1, 2018.

San Antonio Commanders
Jones-Smith signed with the San Antonio Commanders of the Alliance of American Football (AAF) in 2019. He played in all eight games during the 2019 AAF season before the league folded in April 2019.

Miami Dolphins
After the AAF suspended football operations, Jones-Smith signed with the Miami Dolphins on April 9, 2019. He was waived during final roster cuts on August 31, 2019.

San Francisco 49ers
Jones-Smith signed to the San Francisco 49ers' practice squad on October 1, 2019. He re-signed with the 49ers after the 2019 NFL season on February 10, 2020. He was waived during final roster cuts on September 5, 2020.

Las Vegas Raiders
Jones-Smith signed to the Las Vegas Raiders' practice squad on September 8, 2020. He was elevated to the active roster on November 7, November 14, and November 22 for the team's weeks 9, 10, and 11 games against the Los Angeles Chargers, Denver Broncos, and Kansas City Chiefs, and reverted to the practice squad after each game. He signed a reserve/future contract on January 5, 2021.

On August 31, 2021, Jones-Smith was waived by the Raiders.

Baltimore Ravens
On September 21, 2021, Jones-Smith signed with the Baltimore Ravens practice squad. He was released on November 16, 2021, but re-signed on November 23, 2021. He signed a reserve/future contract with the Ravens on January 10, 2022. He was waived on August 23, 2022.

St. Louis BattleHawks 
On November 17, 2022, Jones-Smith was drafted by the St. Louis BattleHawks of the XFL. He was placed on the reserve list by the team on March 7, 2023.

NFL career statistics

References

External links
Las Vegas Raiders bio
Pittsburgh Panthers football bio

1995 births
Living people
Players of American football from Camden, New Jersey
American football offensive tackles
Pittsburgh Panthers football players
Houston Texans players
San Antonio Commanders players
Miami Dolphins players
San Francisco 49ers players
Las Vegas Raiders players
Baltimore Ravens players
St. Louis BattleHawks players